The Western Pennsylvania Conservancy (WPC) is a private nonprofit conservation organization founded in 1932 and headquartered in Pittsburgh, Pennsylvania. WPC has contributed land to 12 state parks and conserved more than a quarter million acres of natural lands. The Conservancy plants and maintains more than 132 gardens in 20 Western Pennsylvania counties, as well as planting thousands of trees through its community forestry program. In 1963, Edgar Kaufmann Jr. entrusted Frank Lloyd Wright's masterwork Fallingwater to the Conservancy. The house was called the most important building of the 20th century by the American Institute of Architects.

Charity Navigator awarded the Conservancy its highest rating for the seventh year. Of the thousands of charities the independent evaluator has reviewed, only 2 percent have received as many consecutive four-star ratings.

History
Three years into the Great Depression, ten citizens came together to found a nonprofit conservation organization. The organization’s goal was to alleviate widespread unemployment through public works programs that would also create a positive impact on the region’s natural resources. Formerly known as the Greater Pittsburgh Parks Association, WPC began its work landscaping a park along Pittsburgh's Bigelow Boulevard. By 1945, the Conservancy was acquiring large tracts of land in Lawrence County that eventually became part of McConnells Mill State Park. In 1961, a 300-acre wildflower reserve was acquired in Beaver County and is still considered to be one of the finest stands of native wildflowers in southwestern Pennsylvania. The wildflower reserve is now part of Raccoon Creek State Park.

Offices 
While the Western Pennsylvania Conservancy's main headquarters is in Pittsburgh, the organization has several regional offices in the state. Offices are also held in Indiana, Mill Run, Ridgway, Franklin, Ligonier, Hollidaysburg and Harrisburg.

Land and Water Conservation
The Conservancy has protected more than a quarter million acres of land since 1932. The Conservancy’s work enables protection of important natural resources and creates economic benefits through an area’s tourism, recreation and forestry. Most of the land preserved by WPC is now publicly owned, becoming some of Pennsylvania's premier parks, forests, game lands and natural areas, or subject to conservation easements that allow public access. WPC acquired land for the creation of 12 state parks, including:

Ohiopyle State Park, including Ferncliff Peninsula National Natural Landmark
Laurel Ridge State Park
Oil Creek State Park
McConnell's Mill State Park
Moraine State Park
Erie Bluffs State Park
Canoe Creek State Park
Cook Forest State Park
Shawnee State Park 
Raccoon Creek State Park
Clear Creek State Park
Blue Knob State Park

The WPC also owns and manages more than 12,000 acres of land throughout Western Pennsylvania. Many of these natural areas offer hiking trails for the public to enjoy. Its largest natural area is Bear Run Nature Reserve in Fayette County, located down the road from Fallingwater. Totaling more than 5,000 acres, this nature reserve features 20 miles of hiking trails and several campsites.

The WPC has also protected or restored more than 3,000 miles of waterways. Its watershed conservation work began as a technical assistance program for watershed groups in Western Pennsylvania. In 2011, the program was formalized to include a full suite of watershed restoration services for local communities. Currently, the Western Pennsylvania Conservancy's watershed conservation program offers in-stream monitoring and assessment, stream restoration and habitat improvement, abandoned mine drainage remediation, riparian buffer plantings, agricultural best management practices and other projects and surveys. The watershed conservation program also provides schools and students of all ages with hands-on educational presentations that help people understand the importance of clean water and healthy ecosystems in Pennsylvania.

Community Gardens, Forestry and Green Spaces
WPC's community gardens and greenspace program plants and maintains 132 community gardens every spring in 20 Western Pennsylvania counties, with the help of 12,000 volunteers. For many decades, the Conservancy has worked with PennDOT, municipalities and other local entities to transform vacant land into community flower gardens.

WPC is also the managing partner of TreeVitalize Pittsburgh, a joint project of Allegheny County, City of Pittsburgh, Tree Pittsburgh, Pennsylvania Department of Conservation and Natural Resources, and the Western Pennsylvania Conservancy. TreeVitalize Pittsburgh has planted more than 29,000 trees since 2008 in an effort to improve the quality of life and the environment in the Pittsburgh region. Through this program, any Allegheny County resident may apply for trees on behalf of their community and all trees are planted on public property. Other community forestry projects led by the WPC include the Pittsburgh Redbud Project, Trees for Ligonier, and the Pittsburgh Street Tree Inventory.

A partnership of WPC, the Grable Foundation and Pittsburgh Public Schools, brought sustainable landscape to 57 Pittsburgh public schools. The project provided outdoor classrooms, natural play spaces and low-care plantings to provide shade, landscape accents and natural points of interest for children.

Biodiversity Conservation and Conservation Science
The Western Pennsylvania Conservancy uses science as an essential tool to prioritize the places that it seeks to protect and set long-term conservation goals. Through its conservation science program and the Pennsylvania Natural Heritage Program (PNHP), WPC scientists provide scientific information, expertise and assistance to support the conservation of Pennsylvania's biological diversity.

The PNHP is a partnership of the Pennsylvania Department of Conservation and Natural Resources, the WPC, and the Pennsylvania Game Commission and the Pennsylvania Fish and Boat Commission. First established in 1981, PNHP is responsible for the inventory and monitoring of threatened and endangered species of (both state and federal) and natural communities. The program also maintains the Pennsylvania Natural Diversity Inventory (PNDI) database, which contains records for threatened, endangered and other listed species and communities.

Fallingwater
The Frank Lloyd Wright-designed Fallingwater house, perched over the Bear Run waterfall at Mill Run, Pennsylvania, is an internationally renowned architectural landmark. Fallingwater was entrusted to the Conservancy by Edgar Kaufmann jr. [sic] in Oct., 1963. Included with this gift was the 1,543 acres of surrounding land known as Bear Run Nature Reserve, now expanded to more than 5,000 acres. The Kaufmann family became acquainted with the Conservancy when they were involved with the early acquisition of Ferncliff Peninsula, later to become the cornerstone of Ohiopyle State Park.

The donation was received under a deed of trust that requires the Conservancy to preserve and maintain the buildings. In 2013, more than 160,000 people visited the house and grounds of Fallingwater, and Fallingwater’s total visitation has surpassed five million guests since it opened to the public in 1964.

Guided tours are offered daily, except Wednesdays.

See also
 Pennsylvania Historical and Museum Commission
 List of Pennsylvania state parks
 Conservation
 Architectural conservation

References

External links
 official Western Pennsylvania Conservancy website
  official Fallingwater website
 Finding aid to the Western Pennsylvania Conservancy Records at the Archives Service Center, University of Pittsburgh

Land trusts in Pennsylvania
Non-profit organizations based in Pittsburgh
Environment of Pennsylvania
Organizations based in Pittsburgh